Fantasy on Japanese Woodprints, Op. 211 (1965), is a concerto in one movement written for xylophone and orchestra by the Armenian-American composer Alan Hovhaness.

He wrote it while studying Oriental musical styles in Japan during his career. Much of the 15-minute work contains many themes of modal Japanese music, especially the last 3 minutes.  Due to the richer and fuller sound, many soloists opt to play the solo part on marimba rather than xylophone.  The piece begins with a series of cadenzas for the soloist, all in free time (senza misura). Under each cadenza, violins and violas hold a soft chord containing many fourths and half-steps, and the basses and cellos are given a series of notes on which they are instructed to improvise until a cutoff.  In between each cadenza, oboes and flutes play a dissonant glissando pattern all in free time until another cutoff.  The concerto develops into an eerie slow adagio, with shimmering chords in the string section and ending with another cadenza.  A dark section in 6/8 ensues, with the xylophonist taking over and playing an extended solo completely in 32nd notes before the orchestra comes in with another free time cadenza.  The piece then launches into a march-like tempo, and the theme is completely stated by xylophone and taiko drums, with timpani playing a repeated rhythm that occurs on a different beat every time.  A 6/8 dance comes back, and then a cadenza in time occurs with a flute playing the melody over the soloist.  A series of loud crescendos and climaxes in free time bring the soloist into his/her final cadenza before a fast 3/4 comes in, with a fierce taiko rhythm and full orchestra buildup to the end.

References

Compositions by Alan Hovhaness
Percussion concertos
Compositions for xylophone
1965 compositions